Fred Marchant is an American poet, and Professor of English and Literature at Suffolk University. He is the director of both the Creative Writing program and The Poetry Center at Suffolk University.

Life
In 1970, he became one of the first officers of the US Marine Corps to be honorably discharged as a conscientious objectors in the Vietnam war.

He is the author of four books of poetry, of which Tipping Point was the winner of the 1993 Washington Prize in poetry. 
He is a graduate of Brown University, and earned a PhD from The University of Chicago's Committee on Social Thought.

He lives in Arlington, MA.

Published works 
Full-length poetry collections
 Tipping Point The Word Works, 1993, ; 2013, 
 Full Moon Boat Graywolf Press, 2000, 
 House on Water, House in Air 2002, 
 The Looking House Graywolf Press, 2009,

References

American male poets
Living people
People from Arlington, Massachusetts
Poets from Massachusetts
Suffolk University faculty
Year of birth missing (living people)
Brown University alumni
University of Chicago alumni